The 2011–12 Philippine Basketball Association (PBA) Philippine Cup is the first conference of the 2011–12 PBA season. The tournament started on October 2, 2011, with Rain or Shine Elasto Painters against Barangay Ginebra Kings as the opening game. The tournament is an All-Filipino format, which does not require an import or a pure-foreign player for each team.

Format
The following format was observed for the duration of the tournament:
Two-round eliminations, with each team playing 14 games. The teams are divided into two groups on the basis of their draft order prior to the trades. Each team will play teams within their group once, while they will play teams from the other group twice.
Group A:
Powerade Tigers (#1)
Rain or Shine Elasto Painters (#4)
B-Meg Llamados (#5)
Petron Blaze Boosters (#8)
Barangay Ginebra Kings (#9)
Group B:
Barako Bull Energy (#2)
Meralco Bolts (#3)
Alaska Aces (#6)
Talk 'N Text Tropang Texters (#7)
Shopinas.com Clickers (#10)
Top eight teams will advance to the quarterfinals. In case of tie, playoffs will be held only for the #2 and #8 seeds.
Quarterfinals:
QF1: #1 seed vs #8 seed (#1 seed twice-to-beat)
QF2: #2 seed vs #7 seed (#1 seed twice-to-beat)
QF3: #3 seed vs #6 seed (best-of-3 series)
QF4: #4 seed vs #5 seed (best-of-3 series)
Semifinals (best-of-7 series):
SF1: QF1 vs. QF4 winners
SF2: QF2 vs. QF3 winners
Finals (best-of-7 series)
Winners of the semifinals

Elimination round

Team standings

Schedule

Results

Bracket

Quarterfinals

(1) B-Meg vs. (8) Powerade

(2) Talk 'N Text vs. (7) Barako Bull

(3) Petron Blaze vs. (6) Meralco

(4) Barangay Ginebra vs. (5) Rain or Shine

Semifinals

(2) Talk 'N Text vs. (3) Petron Blaze

(5) Rain or Shine vs. (8) Powerade

Finals

Statistical leaders

Eliminations

Awards

Conference
Best Player of the Conference: Gary David (Powerade)
Finals MVP: Larry Fonacier (Talk 'N Text)

Players of the Week

References

External links
 PBA.ph

PBA Philippine Cup
Philippine Cup